University Hospital Limerick is a hospital located in Dooradoyle, Limerick, Ireland. It is managed by UL Hospitals Group.

History
The hospital, which was designed by Patrick Sheahan, was officially opened as the Limerick Regional Hospital on 16 May 1955. It became the Mid-Western Regional Hospital, Limerick in 2006. A new critical care unit opened in January 2013.

Following the establishment of the Graduate Medical School at the University of Limerick, it became the University Hospital Limerick in 2013 when the hospitals in the greater Mid-West Region became part of a single operating and governance structure known as the UL Hospitals Group.

Services
The hospital provides 522 beds, of which 375 are in-patient acute beds, while 97 are reserved for acute day cases. A further 50 beds are for psychiatric services. The hospital provides acute-care hospital services, including a 24-hour emergency department and is the location of the Mid-Western Cancer Centre.

A new 60-bed medical block on four storeys, with three inpatient wards of 20 en-suite rooms, built by Western Building Systems, was opened in November 2020.

See also
 Ennis Hospital
 Nenagh Hospital

References

Hospitals in County Limerick
Health Service Executive hospitals
1955 establishments in Ireland
Hospitals established in 1955
Hospital buildings completed in 1955